Jerry McCain, often billed as Jerry "Boogie" McCain (June 18, 1930 – March 28, 2012), was an American electric blues musician, best known as a harmonica player.

Biography
Born near Gadsden, Alabama, United States, he was one of five children of a poor family. Many of his siblings also became involved in music, most notably his brother, Walter, who played drums on some early recordings.  McCain picked up the harmonica from itinerant musicians "Chick" and "Shorty" who played at the local bars (and street corners) when he was young.

McCain was a fan of the music of Little Walter and met the artist when, in 1953, he traveled to Gadsden for a show.  McCain's recording debut came via Trumpet Records the same year under the name "Boogie McCain", with his brother Walter on drums. The two tracks were  "East of the Sun" and "Wine-O-Wine". After recruiting Christopher Collins, who would be with him throughout most of his career, he went on to the Excello label. During his years with the Excello (1955–57) he developed his amplified harmonica style, and unusual blues lyrics. The Excello Label period saw the release of such noted songs as "The Jig's Up", and "My Next Door Neighbor". His later recording for Rex Records "She's Tough" / "Steady" was an inspiration to The Fabulous Thunderbirds, and Kim Wilson duplicated McCain's harp work on their version.

McCain also released singles and albums for Columbia, under their Okeh Records label (1962), and for the Shreveport-based Jewel (1965–68) record label. The complete collection of his Jewel label records are available on a compilation album and, in recent years, several of his early recordings have been released on "retrospective" and compilation CDs, including the Verose Vintage album, Good Stuff.  His longest partner, Ichiban Records, also released several retrospectives in the 1990s, including ICH1516-2: Jerry McCain.

In 1989, after a period spent performing and touring with lesser known bands, McCain signed with Ichiban Records, and released the albums: Blues and Stuff, Struttin' My Stuff, and Love Desperado. During his time with Ichiban, McCain also released one record on the Jericho label, This Stuff Just Kills Me, which featured Jimmie Vaughan and Johnnie Johnson. 
His 1977 release, This Stuff Just Kills Me eventually appeared on the Music Maker label.

In 2002, Ichiban released an album called American Roots: Blues featuring McCain. McCain's abridged work was featured on track 8 of the Rhino Records Blues Masters Volume Four: Harmonica Classics, with an almost lost recording of "Steady".  McCain's inclusion in the Blues Master series, was alongside Little Walter, Jimmy Reed, Junior Wells, Howlin' Wolf, Snooky Pryor, and George "Harmonica" Smith.

The City of Gadsden honored McCain by including his own day at their annual Riverfest Event; a four-day music event. The addition of The Jerry McCain Broad Street Blues Bash rounded out the entertainment and allowed many local citizens to experience McCain. A commemorative CD, featuring some of McCain's music, was compiled for sale at the 1997 Riverfest Event. In 1996, McCain was selected by the Etowah Youth Orchestras as the most well-known musician from Gadsden.  The EYO commissioned the composer Julius Williams to write a work for solo harmonica and orchestra, to be performed by McCain and the Etowah Youth Symphony Orchestra, as a part of the City of Gadsden's Sesquicentennial Celebration.  "Concerto for Blues Harmonica and Orchestra" was premiered in November 1996, on the EYO's Fall Formal Concert at Wallace Hall, on the campus of Gadsden State Community College.  McCain performed the solo harmonica part with the EYSO, under the direction of Michael R. Gagliardo.  The "Concerto" was subsequently performed in Alice Tully Hall, at the Lincoln Center for the Performing Arts in New York City in June 1997, with McCain, the EYSO, and Julius Williams conducting.

Discography

Albums
 1973 : Jerry McCain (Romulus R-108)
 1978 : Living Legend (Zeus S-1021)
 1979 : Blues on the Move Robox EQL-1912)
 1979 : Choo Choo Rock (White Label WLP 9966) Demo recordings for Excello Records 1955-1957
 1980 : Black & Blues (Gas Company GAS 1001) reissued as Black Blues Is Back 1989 (GAS 1001)
 1981 : Southern Harp, Cadillac & The Blues (P-Vine PLP-715) Japan
 1986 : Bad Blues Is My Business (BAD 30001)
 1987 : Midnight Beat (Charly CRB 1148) UK
 1989 : Blues 'n' Stuff (Ichiban ICHCD 1047)
 1991 : Love Desperado (Ichiban ICHCD 9008)
 1991 : Rockin' Harmonica Blues Man with Kid Thomas (Wolf WBJ 018)
 1992 : Struttin' My Stuff (Ichiban/Wild Dog ICH-9020-CD)
 1993 : Jerry 'Boogie' McCain and Others - Strange Kind of Feelin''' (Alligator) 1950s recordings
 1993 : I've Got The Blues All Over Me (Ichiban/Wild Dog ICH-9106-2)
 1995 : That's What They Want: The Best Of (AVI/Excello CD 3009)
 1996 : Turn Your Damper Down (Black & Allright LP001)
 1997 : Rock'n'Roll Ball (Atomic Bomb LP 701)
 1997 : Broad Street Blues Bash (Riverfest CD001)
 1998 : The Jig's Up: Complete 50's Recordings (JMC CD2111)
 1998 : Retospectives (Ichiban ICH 1516-2)
 1999 : This Stuff Just Kills Me (Music Maker) with John Primer.
 1999 : Good Stuff! (Varèse Sarabande VSD-6022)
 2000 : Somebody's Been Talking: The Complete Jewel Singles 1965-72 (Westside WESM 625)
 2000 : Soul Shag (Sterling 20702) UK
 2000 : This Stuff Just Kills Me (Jericho/Cello 90005-2)
 2000 : Southern Harp Attack with Frank Frost (P-Vine PCD-24047) Japan
 2001 : Unplugged (Music Maker JM 200)
 2001 : Absolutely The Best:Complete Jewel Singles 1965-1972 (Varèse Sarabande/Fuel2000 302061098-2)
 2002 : American Roots: Blues (Ichiban CD 1018) 
 2003 : Boogie Is My Name  (Music Maker MMCD 34)
 2008 : Better Late Than Never – The Greatest Hits'' 2 CD (Boogie Down Records 2008)

Singles

References

External links
 
 Music Maker

1930 births
2012 deaths
American blues harmonica players
Musicians from Gadsden, Alabama
Harmonica blues musicians
Jewel Records artists
Okeh Records artists
Blues musicians from Alabama
Trumpet Records artists